Repvåg Church is a chapel of the Church of Norway in Nordkapp Municipality in Troms og Finnmark county, Norway. It is located in the village of Repvåg. It is an annex chapel for the Nordkapp parish which is part of the Hammerfest prosti (deanery) in the Diocese of Nord-Hålogaland. The red, wooden church was built in a long church style in 1967 using plans drawn up by the architect Trond Dancke. The church seats about 50 people. The church is only used a couple of times per year for worship services.

See also
List of churches in Nord-Hålogaland

References

Nordkapp
Churches in Finnmark
Wooden churches in Norway
20th-century Church of Norway church buildings
Churches completed in 1967
1967 establishments in Norway
Long churches in Norway